A list of films produced in Uruguay.

1923-1940

1950s

1960s

1970s

1980s

1990s

2000s

2010s

2020s

References

External links
 Uruguayan film at the Internet Movie Database

Uruguay

Films